Anel (born Ana Elena Noreña Grass on October 10, 1944 in Mexico City, Mexico) is a Mexican actress and former model. She debuted in 1970 on the film Tápame contigo.

Early life 
Anel was born in Mexico City on October 10, 1944. She was the eldest child of Manuel Noreña, a car salesman, and Elena Grass, housewife. When she was little, her father decided to move to Tijuana, Baja California. Soon after, her mom was offered a job as a housekeeper in Los Angeles, California. Anel was only fifteen years old when she found herself working at a mansion in Beverly Hills. While working there she met a lot of Hollywood stars. A chubby teenager, the owner of the mansion took her to her doctor who prescribed her diet pills. She slimmed down and decided to enter Miss Mexico contest at Los Angeles and won first place.

Personal life 
In 1975 Anel had an apasionante relationship with the Argentinian actor Rafael del Río, after that, she married the Mexican singer José José.  Her marriage was unhappy, because José José had the suspicion that José Carmelo wasn't his son, and because she was morbidly obese weighing 450 pounds and her husband was noted to have alcohol problems. Anel dealt with weight-related issues as well. After 15 years of marriage, the couple divorced in 1990. During her marriage she did not work, but after their divorce she started working again.

Filmography

References

External links 

 
 Testimonio Cristiano de Anel Noreña

1944 births
Living people
Actresses from Mexico City
Mexican Christians
Mexican film actresses
Mexican stage actresses
Mexican people of German descent
Mexican telenovela actresses
Mexican television actresses
20th-century Mexican actresses
21st-century Mexican actresses